Dicrastylis is a genus of plants in the  Lamiaceae, first described in 1855. The entire genus is endemic to Australia. The type species is Dicrastylis fulva.

Description 
The fruit is a non-fleshy; indehiscent, 4-celled nut, with each cell having 1-2 seeds. The calyx is five-lobed and woolly outside.

Species
 Dicrastylis archeri Munir - Western Australia
 Dicrastylis beveridgei F.Muell. - Western Australia, South Australia, Northern Territory
Dicrastylis brunnea Munir - Western Australia
Dicrastylis capitellata Munir - Western Australia
Dicrastylis cordifolia Munir - Western Australia
Dicrastylis corymbosa (Endl.) Munir - Western Australia
Dicrastylis costelloi F.M.Bailey - Western Australia, South Australia, Northern Territory
Dicrastylis cundeeleensis Rye - Western Australia
Dicrastylis doranii F.Muell. - Western Australia, South Australia, Northern Territory
Dicrastylis exsuccosa (F.Muell.) Druce - Western Australia, South Australia, Northern Territory
Dicrastylis flexuosa (M.P.Price) C.A.Gardner - Western Australia
Dicrastylis fulva Drumm. ex Harv. - Western Australia
Dicrastylis gilesii F.Muell - Western Australia, Northern Territory
Dicrastylis globiflora (Endl.) Rye - Western Australia
Dicrastylis incana Munir - Western Australia
Dicrastylis kumarinensis Rye - Western Australia
Dicrastylis lewellinii (F.Muell.) F.Muell - South Australia, Northern Territory, Queensland, New South Wales
Dicrastylis linearifolia Munir - Western Australia
Dicrastylis maritima Rye & Trudgen - Western Australia
Dicrastylis micrantha Munir - Western Australia
Dicrastylis mitchellii Rye - Western Australia
Dicrastylis nicholasii F.Muell. - Western Australia
Dicrastylis obovata Munir - Western Australia
Dicrastylis parvifolia F.Muell - Western Australia
Dicrastylis reticulata Drumm. ex Harv.  - Western Australia
Dicrastylis rugosifolia (Munir) Rye - Western Australia
Dicrastylis sessilifolia Munir - Western Australia
Dicrastylis soliparma Rye & Trudgen - Western Australia
Dicrastylis subterminalis Rye - Western Australia
Dicrastylis velutina Munir - Western Australia
Dicrastylis verticillata J.M.Black - South Australia*
(According to the Plants of the World online)

See also

References

 
Lamiaceae
Lamiaceae genera
Endemic flora of Australia